Next = 2017 IWBF Asia-Oceania Championships

2015 Asia Oceania Wheelchair Basketball Championships was an international wheelchair basketball tournament hosted in Chiba, Japan from 10 to 17 October 2015. It served as qualifiers for the 2016 Summer Paralympics.

Venue

Men's

Preliminary round

Group A

Group B

Classification round

9th place

11th place

Final round

Quarterfinals

Semifinals

7th place

5th place

Third place

Final

Final standings

Women's

Results
AUS 53 - 42 JPN
CHN 48 - 37 JPN
CHN 44 - 39 AUS
AUS 61 - 47 JPN
CHN 59 - 38 JPN
CHN 58 - 47 AUS

Final standings

See also
 Wheelchair basketball at the 2016 Summer Paralympics
 2007 Asia Oceania Wheelchair Basketball Championships
 2009 Asia Oceania Wheelchair Basketball Championships
 2011 Asia Oceania Wheelchair Basketball Championships
 2013 Asia Oceania Wheelchair Basketball Championships
 2017 Asia Oceania Wheelchair Basketball Championships
 2019 Asia Oceania Wheelchair Basketball Championships
 2021 Asia Oceania Wheelchair Basketball Championships

References

External links
 Official site of the 2015 IWBF Asia Oceania Championship
 Full Results

International basketball competitions hosted by Japan
2015 in wheelchair basketball
2015 in Japanese sport
2015–16 in Asian basketball
2015–16 in Oceanian basketball